Popgasm is the second album by the Finnish rock band Sunrise Avenue.

Track list
 "Dream Like a Child"
 "The Whole Story"
 "Rising Sun"
 "Welcome to My Life"
 "Not Again"
 "Bad"
 "Monk Bay"
 "Bye Bye (One Night Kind)"
 "Kiss and Run"
 "6-0"
 "Birds and Bees"
 "Sail Away with Me"
 "My Girl Is Mine"
 "Something Sweet"
 "Somebody Will Find You Someday" - (German Digital Download Bonus Track)
 "Runaway" – (Finland Digital Download Bonus Track)

References

Sunrise Avenue albums
2009 albums